The Piaggio P.23M was an Italian commercial transport aircraft prototype designed and built by Piaggio.

Design and development
Piaggio designed the P.23M specifically for flights across the North Atlantic Ocean, intending it to have potential for development as a commercial transport. It was a four-engine shoulder-wing monoplane with inverted gull wings and twin tail fins and rudders. To allow an easier landing if the aircraft had to ditch at sea, its fuselage was designed like a boat hull, which Piaggio termed an avion marin ("marine aviation") design, although the aircraft was not a flying boat. The main landing gear was retractable. The P.23Ms four  Isotta-Fraschini Asso XI R. V-12 engines were mounted on the wings in two tandem pairs, each engine driving a two-bladed propeller; two of the propellers were mounted as pushers and the other two in a tractor configuration.

Piaggio claimed a top speed of 400 kilometers per hour (249 miles per hour) for the P.23 and projected its maximum range at a cruising speed of 300 km/h (186 mph) as 5,100 kilometers (3,169 statute miles).

Operational history
The P.23 first flew in 1935. No attempt to fly the Atlantic Ocean ever took place, and its predicted maximum range capabilities never were tested. The aircraft soon was disassembled and never flew again.

Variants
No variants of the P.23 were produced. The Piaggio P.23R of 1936, although also a commercial transport prototype and confusingly numbered as if it were a variant of the P.23, was an entirely new design.

Operators

Specifications (P.23M)

References

External links

AR Aircraft Manuals Blueprints Video Publications: Piaggio P.23

P.023
1930s Italian airliners
1930s Italian cargo aircraft
Four-engined push-pull aircraft
Shoulder-wing aircraft
Aircraft first flown in 1935